Orphanage tourism is a type of tourism in which the wealthy of western countries visit orphanages in poorer countries. The practice has been described as commodifying the orphans for the benefit of tour operators and the management of the orphanages, while the tourists are exploited for their money. The children are expected to be "poor but happy" and are encouraged to engage in inappropriately intimate encounters with strangers with the risk of abuse.

References

External links 
https://www.hopeandhomes.org/blog-article/orphanage-voluntourism/
https://www.theguardian.com/world/orphanage-tourism

Types of tourism
Orphanages
Philanthropy